Plasmodium circularis is a parasite of the genus Plasmodium subgenus Sauramoeba.

Like all Plasmodium species P. circularis has both vertebrate and insect hosts. The vertebrate hosts for this parasite are reptiles.

Description 
The parasite was first described by Telford and Stein in 2000.

Geographical occurrence 
This species is found in Australia and infects the Australian skink Egernia stokesii.

References 

circularis